Events in chess in 1903:

News

 Siegbert Tarrasch (Germany) wins the Monte Carlo tournament, ahead of Géza Maróczy (Hungary), Harry Pillsbury (United States), Carl Schlechter (Austria), and Richard Teichmann (Germany).
 Mikhail Chigorin wins the 3rd All-Russian Championship in Kiev, ahead of Ossip Bernstein.
 Chigorin (Russia) also wins the Vienna tournament, ahead of Frank Marshall (United States), Georg Marco (Romania), and Pillsbury.  All games in this gambit tournament begin with the King's Gambit.
 The American team wins the Anglo-American cable match by the score 5½–4½.  Pillsbury and Marshall are in Europe to play at the Monte Carlo tournament, so they travel to London to play their games in person.

Births

 Tihomil Drezga (1903–1981) born in Šibenik, Croatia
 Henryk Friedman (1903–1942), Polish master
 Gisela Harum (1903–1995), Austrian chess master
 Menachem Oren (1903–1962) born in Różana, Poland
 Karol Piltz (1903–1939), Polish chess master.
 Solomon Gotthilf (1903–1967), Russian master
 January 1 – Kola Kwariani (1903–1980) professional wrestler, is born in Kutaisi, Georgia
 February 28 – Ozren Nedeljković (1903–1984), Serbian master, is born in Sremski Karlovcim
 March 20 – Vitaly Halberstadt (1903–1967), French endgame study composer, is born in Odessa
 March 29 – Heinrich Reinhardt (1903–1990), German–Argentine master, is born in Stettin
 April 1 – Salo Landau (1903–1943), Dutch player, who died in a Nazi concentration camp is born in Bochnia, Galicia, Austria-Hungary
 April 9 – Morris Schapiro (1903–1996), American investment banker and chess master, is born in Lithuania
  Gregor Piatigorsky (1903–1976), Russian-American cellist and chess patron, is born in Dnipropetrovsk
 June 14 – Lajos Steiner (1903–1975), Hungarian and Australian International Master (1950), is born in Nagyvárad
 August 4 Karl Ruben (date of death unknown), Danish master
 August 21 – William Fairhurst (1903–1982), British and New Zealand International Master (1951), is born in Alderley Edge
 August 25 – Arpad Elo (1903–1992), Hungarian-American player and inventor of the Elo rating system, is born in Egyházaskesző, Austro-Hungarian Empire
 September 17 – George Koltanowski (1903–2000), Belgian and American chess player, is born in Antwerp
 September 27 Boruch Israel Dyner (1903–1979) was a Belgian–Israeli chess master
 October 8 – Georgy Geshev(1903–1937), Bulgarian master, is born in Sofia
 December 20 – Ramón Rey Ardid (1903–1988), Spanish master and Spanish champion from 1929 to 1943.

Deaths

 February 26 – Samuel Tinsley (1847–1903), English player and chess columnist for The Times, competed at Hastings 1895, dies in London.
 June 1 – Josef Noa (1856–1903), Hungarian master, dies in Budapest at age 46.
 August 8 – Gyula Makovetz (1860–1903), Hungarian chess player and editor of the chess magazine Budapesti Sakkszemle, dies in Budapest.

References

 
20th century in chess
Chess by year